Common Ground High School (CGHS) is a charter school in New Haven, Connecticut, United States, that aims to prepare students for "college success and environmental leadership". It was founded in 1997 in the first round of charter schools created in Connecticut and is the oldest environmental charter school in the United States. The school subsequently expanded to reach approximately 180 students. Students are admitted by lottery and any Connecticut high school student is eligible to apply.

Common Ground is located on 20 acres of city park land at the base of West Rock Ridge State Park in New Haven, near the Southern Connecticut State University campus. The school is a program of the New Haven Ecology Project, a non-profit organization that also operates a community environmental education center and urban farm on the same site.

In 2013, work began on a new building and campus improvements that would allow the school to grow to 225 students. This building was completed in the spring 2016.

Awards and recognition
 2011: Green Prize in Public Education Merit Award, National Environmental Education Foundation
 2012: Presidential Innovation Award in Environmental Education, U.S. Environmental Protection Agency (for Lizanne Cox, school director)
 2013: Green Ribbon School, U.S. Department of Education
 2013: School of Distinction, Connecticut State Department of Education

References

External links
 

Schools in New Haven, Connecticut
Public high schools in Connecticut
Charter schools in Connecticut